Shobha Lama is a Nepalese politician from Nepali Congress. Lama is a resident of Jitpursimara, who is elected member of Provincial Assembly of Madhesh Province.

References

External links

Living people
Members of the Provincial Assembly of Madhesh Province
People from Bara District
Nepali Congress politicians from Madhesh Province
1974 births
21st-century Nepalese women politicians
21st-century Nepalese politicians